The following is a timeline of the history of the city of Lilongwe, Malawi.

20th century

 1902 – Local leader Njewa sets up a boma named after the Lilongwe River.
 1904 – Lilongwe becomes administrative seat of British colonial Nyasaland Protectorate.
 1905 – Road built to Dedza.
 1906 – "Asian traders" arrive.
 1909 – Road built to Fort Jameson and Fort Manning.
 1910 – Administrative Lilongwe District created.
 1923 – Diamphwe Bridge built.
 1930 – Imperial Tobacco Company manufactory begins operating.
 1944 – European School founded.
 1949 – Odini Catholic newspaper begins publication.
 1959 – Roman Catholic diocese of Lilongwe established.
 1963 – Lilongwe Technical College founded.
 1964 – Lilongwe becomes part of independent Malawi.
 1966 – Population: 19,425.
 1967 – University of Malawi's Bunda College of Agriculture active.
 1968 – Capitol City Development Corporation formed; Lilongwe "development as the new national capital" begins.
 1975 – Capital of Malawi moved to Lilongwe from Zomba.
 1977
 Silver Strikers F.C. (football club) formed.
 Population: 98,718.
 1979 – University of Malawi's Kamuzu College of Nursing established.
 1983 – Lilongwe International Airport opens.
 1987 – Population: 233,973.
 1989 –  founded.
 1992 – May: Anti-government protest.
 1997 – Media Institute of Southern Africa Malawi chapter headquartered in city.
 1998 – Population: 440,471.

21st century
 2003 – Population: 632,867 in city; 1,087,917 urban agglomeration (estimate).
 2005
 National government administration moved to Lilongwe from Blantyre.
 Banda Mausoleum erected.

 2007
 Lilongwe Wildlife Centre founded.
 Memorial Tower erected.
 2008
 December: Cholera outbreak.
 Population: 674,448 in city.
 2009 – Kelvin Mmangisa appointed mayor.
 2010 – Parliament Building constructed.
 2011 – July: Anti-government protest.
 2012
 Lilongwe University of Agriculture and Natural Resources opens.
 Bingu wa Mutharika Conference Centre built.
 Population: 868,800 in city (estimate).
 2013 – Capital Hill Cashgate Scandal reported.
 2016 – Lilongwe Trade Fair begins.
 2017
 Bingu National Stadium opens.
 Desmond Bikoko becomes mayor.
 July: Stampede occurs at Bingu Stadium.
 2018 - Population: 989,318.
 2020 – Population: 1,324,314 (projected estimate).

See also
 Lilongwe history

References

This article incorporates information from the German Wikipedia and Spanish Wikipedia.

Bibliography

External links

 
  (Bibliography of open access  articles)
 Items related to Lilongwe, various dates (via Europeana)
 Items related to Lilongwe, various dates (via Digital Public Library of America)
  (Bibliography)
  (Bibliography)
  (Bibliography)
  (Bibliography)

Images

Lilongwe
Lilongwe
History of Malawi
Years in Malawi
Malawi history-related lists
Lilongwe